Lagunillas is a location in the Santa Cruz Department in Bolivia. It is the seat of the Lagunillas Municipality, the first municipal section of the Cordillera Province.

References

Populated places in Santa Cruz Department (Bolivia)